Bebearia abesa, the black forester, is a butterfly in the family Nymphalidae. It is found in Sierra Leone, Liberia, Ivory Coast, Ghana, Nigeria, Cameroon, Gabon, the Republic of the Congo, the Democratic Republic of the Congo and Uganda.

Subspecies
Bebearia abesa abesa (Sierra Leone, Liberia, Ivory Coast, Ghana, Nigeria, Cameroon, Gabon, Congo, Democratic Republic of the Congo: Mayumbe, Ubangi, Mongala, Tshopo, Tshuapa, Sankuru)
Bebearia abesa pandera Hecq, 1988 (western Uganda, Democratic Republic of the Congo: Uele)

References

Butterflies described in 1869
abesa
Butterflies of Africa
Taxa named by William Chapman Hewitson